"My Lagan Love" is a song to a traditional Irish air collected in 1903 in northern Donegal.

The English lyrics have been credited to Joseph Campbell (1879–1944, also known as Seosamh MacCathmhaoil and Joseph McCahill, among others). Campbell was a Belfast man whose grandparents came from the Irish-speaking area of Flurrybridge, South Armagh. He started collecting songs in County Antrim. In 1904 he began a collaboration with composer Herbert Hughes. Together, they collected traditional airs from the remote parts of County Donegal.

While on holidays in Donegal, Hughes had learned the air from Proinseas mac Suibhne, who had learned it from his father Seaghan mac Suibhne, who in turn had learned it fifty years previously from a man working with the Ordnance Survey of Ireland. Campbell said that mac Suibhne knew the tune under the title of "The Belfast Maid", but did not know the words. A song by this title was published in various early 19th century broadsides, with the first lines "In Belfast town of high renown / There lives a comely maid". This ballad now has Roud number 2930.

The Lagan referred to in the title most likely is the River Lagan in Belfast. Campbell's words mention Lambeg, which is just outside the city.
The Lagan is the river that runs through Belfast. However, some argue that the Lagan in the song refers to a stream that empties into Lough Swilly in County Donegal, not far from where Herbert Hughes collected the song.

The song was arranged in a classical style by Hamilton Harty; this was used by Mary O'Hara and Charlotte Church.

Covers
 1910: John McCormack
 1953: Margaret Barry on I Sang Through the Fairs (The Alan Lomax Portrait Series)
 1967: Dusty Springfield on her BBCTV series.
 1968: Emmet Spiceland on The First
 1969: Esther Ofarim on Dieter Finnern show, Berlin
 1976: Horslips on The Book of Invasions: A Celtic Symphony (instrumental)
 1977: Bob McGrath on Sleepytime Bird
 1985: Kate Bush, bonus material on a 1997 re-release of Hounds of Love with lyrics written by John Carder Bush, Kate's brother
 1987: Vermilion Sands on Water Blue
 1987: Capercaillie on Crosswinds as "My Laggan Love/Fox on the Town" (instrumental)
 1988: Van Morrison and The Chieftains on Irish Heartbeat
 1990: Meg Davis on The Claddagh Walk
 1994: Jean Redpath on Jean Redpath
 1994: Barbara Dickson on Parcel of Rogues
 1995: Brendan Power on "New Irish Harmonica" as "My Lagan Love"
 1995: Caroline Lavelle on Spirit as "Lagan Love"
 1996: Jim McCann on Grace and Other Love Songs
 1997: James Galway and Phil Coulter on "Legends"
 1998: Charlotte Church on Voice of an Angel
 1998: Pentangle on Passe Avant
 1999: Sheila Chandra on Moonsung as "Lagan Love/Nada Brahma"
 1999: Carol Noonan on her recording Self-Titled as "Lagan Love"
 2002: Sinéad O'Connor on Sean-Nós Nua
 2003: Anuna on Invocation
 2004: Sharon Knight on Song of the Sea.
 2005: The Corrs on Home
 2009: Celtic Woman on Celtic Woman: Songs from the Heart
 2010: Fionnuala Sherry on Songs From Before
 2011: Celtic Thunder on Storm
 2011: Lone Raven/Kara Markley on Flight to the Hinterlands
 2011: Hayley Griffiths on Celtic Rose
 2012: Lisa Hannigan and The Chieftains on The Chieftains: Voice of Ages
 2012: Niopha Keegan on lead vocals with The Unthanks on The Unthanks with Brighouse and Rastrick Brass Band
 2012: Karnataka (band) on New Light
 2018: Mary Coughlan on the Cúl An Tí  DVD (where she sings Gabriel Rosenstock's Gaelic translation with Kíla accompanying)
 2020: The Haar on their eponymous debut album The Haar.
 2021: Hozier (musician) on Series 19 of RTE2's Other Voices (TV series)

References

John A. McLaughlin: One Green Hill, 2003. Beyond the Pale, Belfast. .

External links 
 Antony Kearns : Irish Repertoire
 Folk & Traditional Song Lyrics - My Lagan Love

Irish songs
Irish folk songs
Year of song unknown